At the 1988 Summer Olympics, eight fencing events were contested. Men competed in both individual and team events for each of the three weapon types (épée, foil and sabre), but women competed only in foil events.

Medal summary

Men's events

Women's events

Medal table
West Germany finished top of the fencing medal table at the 1988 Summer Olympics, which included a clean-sweap in the Women's foil events.

Participating nations
A total of 317 fencers (248 men and 69 women) from 42 nations competed at the Seoul Games:

References

External links
Official Olympic Report

 
1988
1988 Summer Olympics events
1988 in fencing
International fencing competitions hosted by South Korea